Julius Caesar is the name of a bust by 16th century artist Andrea Ferrucci depicting Roman dictator Julius Caesar. The sculpture is a Chiaramonti-Pisa type style bust of Caesar inspired by the Chiaramonti Caesar portrait.

History
The bust was made between 1512 and 1514. It is now located at the Metropolitan Museum of Art in New York City.

Description
The bust portrays Caesar at about the age of 45 to 50, showing some wrinkles, but still vigorous with a thin, broad forehead, direct eyes, Roman nose, smallish jawline with a slightly prominent chin and a long neck, wearing a breastplate with a screaming Medusa and a Roman eagle.

Analysis
The bust is often compared to Michelangelo's Brutus in style and character.

See also
 Cultural depictions of Julius Caesar

References

External links

 Julius Caesar, ca. 1512–14 by Andrea di Pietro di Marco Ferrucci on the Metropolitan Museum of Art website
 Bust at Google Arts & Culture

Busts of Julius Caesar